is a retired volleyball player from Japan.  She was part of the Japanese team that won the bronze medal at the 2012 Summer Olympics.

She played as a libero for the Women's National Team at the 2008 Olympic Qualification Tournament in Japan. There the team ended up in third place, and qualified for the 2008 Summer Olympics. Afterwards Sano was named Best Digger and Best Receiver at the event.

Career
Sano played at the 2013 Club World Championship with Voléro Zürich and she was selected Best Libero. Her team lost the bronze medal to Guangdong Evergrande.

Clubs
 Kitasaga High School
 Unitika (1998–2000)
 Toray Arrows (2000–2003)
 RC Cannes (2004–2006)
 Hisamitsu Springs (2006–2010)
 Igtisadchi Baku (2010-2012)
 Galatasaray Daikin (2012-2013)
 Voléro Zürich (2013-2014)
 Denso Airybees (2013-2014)

Awards

Individuals
2003 9th V.League : Best Libero award, Servereceive award.
2006 Women's CEV Champions League : Best Libero award.
2007 2006-07 V.Premier League : Best Libero award.
 2007 Asian Club Championship "Best Receiver"
2007 14th Asian Women's Volleyball Championship : Best Receiver award
2007 Volleyball World Cup : Best Receiver award, Best Digger award.
2008 2007-08 V.Premier League : Best Libero award, Servereceive award
 2008 FIVB World Grand Prix "Best Libero"
 2008 Olympic Qualifier "Best Digger"
 2008 Olympic Qualifier "Best Receiver"
2009 2008-09 V.Premier League : Best Libero award, Servereceive award, Excellent Player award
 2011 World Cup "Best Digger"
 2012-13 CEV Champions League "Best Receiver"
 2013 FIVB Women's Club World Championship "Best Libero"
 2014 FIVB World Grand Prix "Best Libero"
 2014 FIVB World Grand Prix "Most Valuable Player"

Team
 2006-07 V.Premier League -  Champion, with Hisamitsu Springs.
 2007 Kurowashiki All Japan Volleyball Championship -  Champion, with Hisamitsu Springs.
 2007 Asian Club Championship -  Bronze Medal with Hisamitsu Springs
 2007-08 Empress's Cup -   Runner-Up, with Hisamitsu Springs.
 2008-09 V.Premier League -  Runner-Up, with Hisamitsu Springs.
 2009 Empress's Cup -   Champion, with Hisamitsu Springs.
 2009 Kurowashiki All Japan Volleyball Championship -  Runner-Up, with Hisamitsu Springs.
 2012 Turkish Volleyball Super Cup -  Runner-Up, with Galatasaray Daikin
 2012-2013 Turkish Women's Volleyball Cup -  Bronze Medal with Galatasaray Daikin

National team

Senior Team
2007 Asian Championship -  Gold medal
2009 Asian Championship -  Bronze medal
2010 World Championship -  Bronze medal
2011 Asian Championship -  Silver medal
2012 Olympics -  Bronze medal
2014 FIVB World Grand Prix -  Silver medal

References

External links 
 FIVB Biography

Volleyball players at the 2008 Summer Olympics
1979 births
Living people
Olympic volleyball players of Japan
People from Takatsuki, Osaka
Volleyball players at the 2012 Summer Olympics
Olympic bronze medalists for Japan
Olympic medalists in volleyball
Japanese women's volleyball players
Galatasaray S.K. (women's volleyball) players
Medalists at the 2012 Summer Olympics
Asian Games medalists in volleyball
Volleyball players at the 2002 Asian Games
Asian Games bronze medalists for Japan
Medalists at the 2002 Asian Games